Alfred Harris may refer to:

People
Al Harris (defensive lineman) (born 1956), American college and professional football player
Alfred Charles Harris, English-born Australian architect, co-designer of  Savings Bank of South Australia head office in 1938
Alfred F. Harris, founder of Harris Corporation, father of Alfred S. Harris
Alfred S. Harris (1891–1947), American businessman, son of Alfred F. Harris
Alfred W. Harris (1854–?), American lawyer and legislator in Virginia

Fictional characters
Alfred Harris (Upstairs, Downstairs), a fictional character of the British television series Upstairs, Downstairs

See also
Al Harris (disambiguation)